The Yokohama Line is a Japanese railway line of the East Japan Railway Company (JR East) connecting Higashi-Kanagawa Station in Yokohama, Kanagawa and Hachiōji Station in Hachiōji, Tokyo. The line forms part of what JR East refers to as the "Tokyo Mega Loop" around Tokyo, consisting of the Keiyo Line, Musashino Line, Nambu Line, and Yokohama Line. The line's name comes from the section between Nagatsuta and Higashi-Kanagawa that runs through the city of Yokohama.

History

The line was opened by the private  on 23 September 1908 and leased to the government in 1910. The line was nationalized on 1 October 1917.

The Higashi-Kanagawa to Haramachida (now Machida) section was electrified on 1 October 1932, with the Haramachida to Hachiōji section electrified on 14 April 1941.

The Higashi-Kanagawa to Kozukue section was double-tracked by 1968, extended to Aihara by 1980, and completed to Hachiōji on 6 March 1988.

Through service trains from the Sagami Line began on 16 March 1991, when that line was fully electrified. 

Station numbering was introduced on 20 August 2016 with stations being assigned station numbers between JH13 and JH32. Numbers increase towards in the westbound direction towards Hachioji.

The through service operation onto the Sagami Line ended on 11 March 2022.

Operation
Despite the line's name, only approximately half of all trains run as far as Yokohama Station.  trains operate every 20 minutes during the daytime.

Stations 
 Local trains stop at all stations.
 Information on the limited express Hama Kaiji service can be found on its page.
 Rapid trains stop at stations marked "●" and pass those marked "｜".
 From Yokohama to Ofuna, the stations are the same stations served by the Negishi Line.

Rolling stock

Local and Rapid services

 E233-6000 series 8-car EMUs (since February 2014)

Former

 72 series
 103 series (from 2 October 1972 until 26 February 1989)
 205 series 8-car EMUs (1988 to August 2014)

Sagami Line through services
 205-500 series 4-car EMUs (from 16 March 1991 until 25 February 2022)
 E131-500 series 4-car EMUs (from 18 November 2021 until 11 March 2022)

8-car 205 series EMU trains were introduced in 1988. In these sets, the second car from the Higashi-Kanagawa end had six pairs of doors on each side to allow rapid boarding and disembarking during peak periods. The last 205 series set on the Yokohama Line ran on 23 August 2014.

References

External links

 JR East website

 
Lines of East Japan Railway Company
Railway lines in Kanagawa Prefecture
1067 mm gauge railways in Japan
Railway lines opened in 1908
1908 establishments in Japan